This is a '''list of television stations in Western Asia.

Armenia

 A21TV (Armenia)
 Armenia 2
 Armenia TV
 Armnews TV
 Hrazdan TV
 Kentron TV
 Public Television Company of Armenia
 Shant TV
 Shoghakat TV

Azerbaijan

 AzTV
Cartoon Network
 İdman Azərbaycan
 İTV
 Mədəniyyət TV

Cyprus

 Alpha TV Cyprus
 ANT1 Cyprus
Boomerang
Cartoon Network
Disney Channel
 Cyprus Broadcasting Corporation
 MAD TV (Cypriot TV channel)
MTV Greece
Nickelodeon Greece
Nick Jr. Greece
 Omega TV Cyprus
 Plus TV (Cyprus)
 RIK 1
 RIK 2
 Sigma TV

Georgia

 Adjarasport  
 First Channel (Georgian TV channel)
 Imedi Media Holding 
 Maestro TV
 Mze TV 
 Rustavi 2
 Second Channel (Georgian TV Channel)
 TV Sakartvelo
 TV XXI

Iraq
Afaq TV
Al TV
Asia Network Television
Baghdad Satellite Channel
Cartoon Network Arabic
Disney Channel
Dijlah TV
HadiTV
Ishtar TV
Kanal4
Karbala TV
Kurdish News Network
Kurdistan TV
Music Al Remas TV
MTV
Nickelodeon
Nick Jr.
NickToons
NRT News
Rudaw Media Network
Samarra TV
Türkmeneli TV
Vîn TV
Zagros TV
Zaro tv

Israel

 Arutz HaYeladim
 Channel 9
 Channel 12
 Channel 13
 Channel 20
 Channel 24
Disney Channel
 Ego
 Hop! Channel
 Hot 3
 Hot Comedy Central
 I24 News
 Israeli Educational Television
 Israeli Network
 Kan
 Knesset Channel
 Makan 33
 Musawa
Nickelodeon
Nick Jr.
 Teddy Channel
 Yes Action
 Yes Base
 Yes Comedy
 Yes Drama
 Yes Oh
 Yes Stars HD

Lebanon
MTV (Lebanon)
Cartoon Network Arabic
Disney Channel
Nickelodeon
Nick Jr.
NickToons

See also

 Lists of television channels
 List of Arabic-language television channels
 List of television stations in Central Asia
 List of television stations in Southeast Asia
 List of television stations in South Asia
 List of television stations in East Asia

Asia-related lists
Television stations
Western Asia